The 2010–11 GET-ligaen is the 72nd season of Norway's premier ice hockey league, Eliteserien (known as GET-ligaen for sponsorship reasons). The regular season began on 18 September 2010 and is scheduled to end on 27 February 2011.

Regular season

Final standings

GP = Games played; W = Wins; L = Losses; OTW = Overtime Wins; OTL = Overtime losses; SOW = Shootout Wins; SOL = Shootout losses; PCT = Percent of possible points; GF = Goals for; GA = Goals against; PIM = Penalties in minutes; Pts = Points; C = ChampionsSource: pointstreak.com

Statistics

Scoring leaders
These are the top ten skaters based on points. If the list exceeds ten skaters because of a tie in points, all of the tied skaters are shown.
GP = Games played; G = Goals; A = Assists; Pts = Points; +/– = Plus/minus; PIM = Penalty minutes

Leading goaltenders
These are the top five goaltenders based on goals against average.
GP = Games played; TOI = Time on ice (minutes); W = Wins; L = Losses; GA = Goals against; SO = Shutouts; Sv% = Save percentage; GAA = Goals against average

Attendance

Source: pointstreak.com

Playoffs
After the regular season, the standard of eight teams qualified for the playoffs. In the first and second rounds, the highest remaining seed chooses which of the two lowest remaining seeds to be matched against. In each round the higher-seeded team is awarded home ice advantage. Each best-of-seven series follows a 1–1–1–1–1–1–1 format: the higher-seeded team plays at home for games 1 and 3 (plus 5 and 7 if necessary), and the lower-seeded team at home for games 2, 4 and 6 (if necessary).

Bracket

Source: pointstreak.com

Game log

|(1) Sparta Warriors vs. (8) Rosenborg

Sparta won series 4–0

(2) Stavanger Oilers vs. (7) Frisk Asker

Stavanger won series 4–1

(3) Vålerenga vs. (6) Lørenskog

Lørenskog won series 4–1

(4) Storhamar Dragons vs. (5) Lillehammer

Lillehammer won series 4–1
|-

|(1) Sparta Warriors vs. (5) Lillehammer

Sparta won series 4–1

(2) Stavanger Oilers vs. (6) Lørenskog

Stavanger won series 4–2
|-

|(1) Sparta Warriors vs. (2) Stavanger Oilers

Sparta won series 4–1

Statistics

Scoring leaders
These are the top ten skaters in the playoffs based on points. If the list exceeds ten skaters because of a tie in points, all of the tied skaters are shown.
GP = Games played; G = Goals; A = Assists; Pts = Points; +/– = Plus/minus; PIM = Penalty minutes

Leading goaltenders
These are the top five goaltenders in the playoffs based on goals against average.
GP = Games played; TOI = Time on ice (minutes); W = Wins; L = Losses; GA = Goals against; SO = Shutouts; Sv% = Save percentage; GAA = Goals against average

Qualifying for GET-ligaen 2011–12

Final standings

GP = Games played; W = Wins; L = Losses; OTW = Overtime Wins; OTL = Overtime losses; SOW = Shootout Wins; SOL = Shootout losses; PCT = Percentage of possible points; GF = Goals for; GA = Goals against; PIM = Penalties in minutes; Pts = Points; Q = QualifiedSource: hockey.no

Game log

|Round 1

Round 2

Round 3

Round 4

Round 5

Round 6

Awards
All-Star team

The following players were selected to the 2010–11 GET-ligaen All-Star team:
Goaltender: Trevor Koenig (Storhamar)
Defenseman: Mat Robinson (Sparta)
Defenseman: Scott Hotham (Lillehammer)
Center: Gino Guyer (Lillehammer)
Winger: Martin Strandfeldt (Stavanger)
Winger: Henrik Malmström (Sparta)

Other
Player of the year: Gino Guyer (Lillehammer)
Coach of the year: Petter Thoresen (Stavanger)
Playoff MVP: Henrik Malmström (Sparta)

References

External links
  

2010-11
Norway
GET-ligaen